Elvis Ochieng Ochoro  (born 23 October 2001) is a goalkeeper currently in the ranks of Kenyan Premier League side Nairobi City Stars.

Career 
Ichoro joined the City Stars in September 2020 after being scouted during the Chapa Dimba na Safaricom regional finals in February 2020 where he was named the best keeper. 

After sitting out 32 games as an unused substitute over two seasons, Ochoro finally made his Kenyan Premier League debut in the 2021-22 FKF Premier League tie against FC Talanta at Kasarani Annex on Sun 12 June 2022

Kenya U20
In October 2020 he made the provisional Kenya U20 squad shaping up for CECAFA U20 Championship in Tanzania, and in May 2021, he was listed amongst the 'Top 50 promising Kenyan U-23 players' by Mozzart Sports.

References

2001 births
Living people
Kenyan footballers
Association football goalkeepers
Kenyan Premier League players
Nairobi City Stars players